The EA827 family of petrol engines was initially developed by Audi under Ludwig Kraus leadership and introduced in 1972 by the B1-series Audi 80, and went on to power many Volkswagen Group models. This is a very robust water-cooled engine configuration for four- up to eight- cylinders. 
In Brazil this engine was produced under the name  AP (Alta Performance, "high performance").

There was also a range of EA827 diesel engines, sharing its  cylinder spacing with the spark ignition petrol engines.

60 hp 1.3
 configuration  1,297 cc (78 cu in) inline-four, bore  × stroke 
 head  SOHC two valves per cylinder
 block  grey cast iron, five bearings
 output   at 5,500 rpm,  at 3,200 rpm
fuel  carburettor
 application  Audi 80, Volkswagen Passat

84 hp 1.4
 configuration  1,423 cc inline-four, bore  × stroke 
 head  SOHC 2-valve per cylinder, 10:1 compression
 block  cast iron, five bearings
 output   at 5,500 rpm,  at 4,200 rpm
 fuel  electronic injection [SPI] or carburettor
 aspiration  cast aluminum intake manifold, cast iron exhaust manifold
 application  Volkswagen Citi Golf (South Africa)

70 hp 1.5
 configuration  1,457 cc (89 cu in) inline-four, bore  × stroke 
 head  SOHC 2-valve per cylinder
 block  grey cast iron, five bearings
 output   at 5,600 rpm,  at 2,800 rpm
fuel  carburettor
 application  Volkswagen Golf, Audi 80, Volkswagen Passat, Volkswagen Scirocco

85 hp 1.5
 configuration  1,457 cc (89 in³) inline-four, bore  × stroke 
 head  SOHC 2-valve per cylinder
 block grey cast iron, five bearings
 output   at 5,600 rpm,  at 3,200 rpm
fuel  carburettor
 application  Volkswagen Golf, Audi 80, Volkswagen Passat

85–110 hp 1.6 (GTI)
 configuration  1588 cc (96 in³) inline 4, bore  × stroke 
 head  SOHC 2-valve per cylinder
 block grey cast iron, five bearings
 output   at 5600 rpm,  at 2800 rpm
 output (GTI)   at 5800 rpm,  at 4000 rpm
fuel  carburettor, K-Jetronic
 application  Volkswagen Golf GTI, Volkswagen Scirocco GTI, Audi 80, Volkswagen Passat

70–102 hp 1.6
 configuration  1595 cc (97 in³) inline 4, bore  × stroke , 1.05 ratio
 head  SOHC 2-valve per cylinder
 block  grey cast iron, five bearings
 output 

fuel  Ecotronic carburettor, KE-Jetronic, Simos AFX has VWSA Bosch MP9 injection
 aspiration  cast aluminum intake manifold, plastic variable length intake manifold, cast iron exhaust manifold

1.7
A 1,715 cc engine, originally used in the German Volkswagen Iltis, was also used mainly in the US market Sciroccos, Rabbits and Jettas but also in the Audi 4000 B2. It was built in Volkswagen of America's plant in New Stanton, Pennsylvania. This engine was also used in the Dodge Omni/Plymouth Horizon family of cars from 1978 until 1983.

 configuration   inline-four, bore  × stroke

75–112 hp 1.8

 configuration  1781 cc inline 4, : bore /stroke 81/ 86.4 mm
 head  SOHC 2-valve per cylinder
 block  grey cast iron, five main bearings
 fuel  carburettor, K/KE-Jetronic, mono-Motronic, mono-jetronic, CIS, CIS E, Digifant I, Digifant II
 output 

 applications Audi 80, Audi 100, Volkswagen Cabriolet, VW Golf/Rabbit, Volkswagen Passat, Volkswagen Jetta

113 hp 1.9E
 configuration  1847 cc inline 4, : bore /stroke 82,5/ 86.4 mm

 head  SOHC 2-valve per cylinder, 10,5: 1 compression ratio
 block  grey cast iron, five bearings
 fuel  KE-Jetronic
 output    at 5600 rpm,    at 3400 rpm
fuel  KE-Jetronic
 application  Audi 80, Audi 100

129–139 hp 1.8 16V

 configuration  1781 cc inline 4, : bore /stroke 81/ 86.4 mm
 head  DOHC 4-valve per cylinder
 block  grey cast iron, five bearings
 fuel  K/KE-Jetronic
 output    in SEAT Toledo MY 1992–1995
          in SEAT Ibiza, SEAT Córdoba - ADL
	  in Volkswagen Golf, Volkswagen Jetta, Volkswagen Corrado
 application  Volkswagen Golf, Volkswagen Scirocco, SEAT Ibiza, SEAT Córdoba, SEAT Toledo, Volkswagen Jetta, Volkswagen Passat, Volkswagen Corrado

90–115 hp 2.0
engine displacement & engine configuration  inline-four engine (R4/I4); bore x stroke: , stroke ratio: 0.89:1 - undersquare/long-stroke, 496.1 cc per cylinder, compression ratio: 10.0-10.5:1
cylinder block & crankcase CG25 grey cast iron; five main bearings; die–forged steel crankshaft, forged steel connecting rods
cylinder head & valvetrain cast aluminium alloy; two valves per cylinder, 8 valves total, hydraulic bucket tappets, timing belt-driven one-piece cast single overhead camshaft (SOHC)
aspiration cast aluminium alloy intake manifold
engine management Bosch Motronic or Siemens Simos electronic engine control unit (ECU)
EWG-rated motive power & torque outputs, application, ID codes
 at 2,800 rpm;  at 2,100-2,400 rpm — Volkswagen Industrial Motor multi-fuel (petrol / LPG / CNG) - CBS (08/06->)
 at 2,800 rpm;  at 2,100-2,400 rpm — Volkswagen Industrial Motor multi-fuel (petrol / LPG / CNG) - BEF (04/02->)
DIN-rated motive power & torque outputs, ID codes
 at 5,400 rpm;  at 3,500 rpm — Ecofuel (bivalent) (CNG) Touran, Caddy, Transporter/Caravelle - BSX
 at 5,400 rpm;  at 3,200 rpm — AWG, AWF
 at 5,400 rpm;  at 2,600 rpm — AGG
 at 5,400 rpm;  at 3,200 rpm — 2E, ADY, ABA
 at 5,200 rpm;  at 2,400 rpm — APK, AQY
 at 5,200 rpm;  at 2,600 rpm — ATM
 at 5,200 rpm;  at 2,700-4,700 rpm — AXA
 at 5,400 rpm;  at 3,200 rpm — AZH, AZJ
 at 5,400 rpm;  at 3,500 rpm — AZM
 at 5,600 rpm;  at 2,400 rpm — ATF
 at 5,600 rpm;  at 2,600 rpm — AUZ, ASU, AVA
applications SEAT Ibiza Mk2 & Mk3, SEAT Córdoba, SEAT Toledo Mk1, SEAT Alhambra, Škoda Fabia Mk1 (6Y), Škoda Octavia Mk1 (1U), Škoda Superb Mk1 (3U), Volkswagen Santana, Volkswagen Polo Mk4, Volkswagen Golf Mk3, Volkswagen Golf Mk4, Volkswagen Vento, Volkswagen Bora, Volkswagen Jetta, Volkswagen New Beetle, Volkswagen Passat B3, Volkswagen Passat B4, Volkswagen Passat B5, Volkswagen Sharan (7M), Volkswagen Transporter (T5), Volkswagen Industrial Motor, Audi 80, Audi 100
 This engine was neither assembled in the Porsche 924 nor in the AMC Gremlin, their respective engines being based on the 2.0 EA831 engine).

134 - 150 hp 2.0 16V
 Configuration  1,984 cc inline 4 (121 in³)
 Cylinders bore × stroke 82.5 × 92.8 mm (0.89), 496 cc/cylinder, 10.5:1 compression ratio
 Block  grey cast iron, five bearings
 Head  DOHC 4-valve per cylinder
 Fuel  KE-Motronic ("CIS-E Motronic"), Digifant
 output ,   VW Passat B3 16V VW Jetta, Golf MKII, Golf MKIII, VW Corrado 16V
 output ,   Audi 80/100 for some European markets
 output    at 6000 rpm,    at 4800 rpm VW Golf III GTI 16V, VW Passat B4 16V
 application  Volkswagen Golf GTI, Volkswagen Passat, Audi 100, SEAT Cordoba;Mk1, SEAT Ibiza Mk2, SEAT ToledoMk1, Volkswagen Jetta GLI, GTX, Golf GTI 16v, MK-II 1996-1999 146 cv, MK-III 2000 153 cv (Brazil), Parati GTI 16V (Brazil)

160/210 hp G60
 configuration  1781 cc inline 4, : bore /stroke 81/ 86.4 mm
 head  SOHC 2-valve per cylinder, 8.0:1 compression ratio
 head  DOHC 4-valves per cylinder, 8,5:1 cpr
 block  Code PG grey cast iron, five bearings
 fuel  Bosch

 aspiration belt-driven G-Charger with intercooler

 output    at 5800 rpm,    at 3500 rpm
 output    at 5500 rpm,    at 4200 rpm
 tuned    at 5300 rpm,    at 3200 rpm
 application  Volkswagen Golf G60, Volkswagen Passat G60, Volkswagen Corrado G60

See also

list of Volkswagen Group petrol engines
list of Volkswagen Group diesel engines
list of discontinued Volkswagen Group petrol engines
list of discontinued Volkswagen Group diesel engines
list of North American Volkswagen engines
Wasserboxer
VR6 engine
Turbocharged Direct Injection (TDI)
Suction Diesel Injection (SDI)
BlueMotion
list of Volkswagen Group platforms

References

Volkswagen engine codes
Audi engine codes

External links
Volkswagen Group corporate website
Chemnitz (Germany) - engine plant Mobility and Sustainability
Kassel (Germany) - engine plant Mobility and Sustainability
Salzgitter (Germany) - engine plant Mobility and Sustainability
Polkowice (Poland) - engine plant Mobility and Sustainability
São Carlos (Brazil) - engine plant Mobility and Sustainability
Shanghai (China) - engine plant Mobility and Sustainability
Audi at a glance - includes information on the Győr engine plant 

EA827
EA827
Diesel engines by model